Paul Austin Crotty (born April 1, 1941) is a senior United States district judge of the United States District Court for the Southern District of New York.

Education and career

Born in Buffalo, New York, Crotty received a Bachelor of Arts degree from the University of Notre Dame in 1962 and a Bachelor of Laws from Cornell Law School in 1967. He was also in the United States Navy Reserve from 1962 to 1968. He was a law clerk to Judge Lloyd F. MacMahon of the United States District Court for the Southern District of New York, from 1967 to 1969. Crotty entered private practice in New York City at the prominent law firm of Donovan, Leisure, Newton & Irvine, working there as an associate from 1969 to 1976, and then as a partner from 1976 to 1984, and from 1988 to 1993. From 1984 to 1988, he held several government positions in the Office of Financial Services for the City of New York. He was a commissioner in that office in 1984, and then Commissioner of Finance from 1984 to 1986, and a commissioner for Housing Preservation & Development until 1988. After having returned to private practice for a time, he became the Corporation Counsel from 1994 to 1997, and group president for the New York and Connecticut region for Verizon Communications from 1997 to 2005.

Federal judicial service

On February 14, 2005, Crotty was nominated by President George W. Bush to a seat on the United States District Court for the Southern District of New York vacated by Harold Baer Jr. Crotty was confirmed by the United States Senate on April 11, 2005, and received his commission on April 15, 2005. He assumed senior status on August 1, 2015.

References

Sources

Paul A. Crotty Resume

1941 births
Living people
Cornell Law School alumni
Judges of the United States District Court for the Southern District of New York
Lawyers from Buffalo, New York
Military personnel from Buffalo, New York
United States district court judges appointed by George W. Bush
21st-century American judges
University of Notre Dame alumni